Unitech may refer to:

Unitech Group, real estate developer based in Delhi, India
UNITECH International, a union of European universities
Papua New Guinea University of Technology
Infogix, Inc., formerly known as Unitech Systems
2006 Unitech Cup, cricket contest between home team Sri Lanka and India

See also
Unitec (disambiguation)
United Technologies